Transtejo & Soflusa is a public ferry company operating between Lisbon, on the right (north) bank of the Tagus River, to the left (south) bank of the river at Trafaria, Porto Brandão, Cacilhas (Almada), Seixal, Barreiro and Montijo.

Routes
Transtejo & Soflusa operates 5 routes across the Tagus.

 Cais do Sodré - Cacilhas
 Cais do Sodré - Seixal
 Cais do Sodré - Montijo
 Belém - Porto Brandão - Trafaria
 Terreiro do Paço - Barreiro

Fleet
The company operates a fleet of 35 vessels of different types built in Portugal, Singapore, Australia, the United Kingdom and Germany. It includes  20 catamarans, 2 car ferries and 13 conventional ferries.

References

External links
Official website of Transtejo & Soflusa
Website about Lisbon river ferries

Ferry companies of Portugal
Transport in Lisbon
Water taxis